In Greek mythology, Cleomestra was a Trojan princess as daughter of King Tros and probably, Callirrhoe, daughter of the river god Scamander, or Acallaris, daughter of Eumedes. She was the sister of Ilus, Assaracus, Ganymede and possibly, Cleopatra. Cleomestra became the mother of Assaracus, Antenor and maybe of Alcathous by Aesyetes. Cleomestra and Cleopatra, as daughters of Tros are probably the same person.

Notes

References 

 Dictys Cretensis, from The Trojan War. The Chronicles of Dictys of Crete and Dares the Phrygian translated by Richard McIlwaine Frazer, Jr. (1931-). Indiana University Press. 1966. Online version at the Topos Text Project.
Dionysus of Halicarnassus, Roman Antiquities. English translation by Earnest Cary in the Loeb Classical Library, 7 volumes. Harvard University Press, 1937-1950. Online version at Bill Thayer's Web Site
Dionysius of Halicarnassus, Antiquitatum Romanarum quae supersunt, Vol I-IV. . Karl Jacoby. In Aedibus B.G. Teubneri. Leipzig. 1885. Greek text available at the Perseus Digital Library.
Homer, The Iliad with an English Translation by A.T. Murray, Ph.D. in two volumes. Cambridge, MA., Harvard University Press; London, William Heinemann, Ltd. 1924. . Online version at the Perseus Digital Library.
 Homer, Homeri Opera in five volumes. Oxford, Oxford University Press. 1920. . Greek text available at the Perseus Digital Library.
Pseudo-Apollodorus, The Library with an English Translation by Sir James George Frazer, F.B.A., F.R.S. in 2 Volumes, Cambridge, MA, Harvard University Press; London, William Heinemann Ltd. 1921. . Online version at the Perseus Digital Library. Greek text available from the same website.

Princesses in Greek mythology
Queens in Greek mythology
Trojans